The European Women's Lobby (EWL) describes itself as the largest umbrella organization of women's associations in the European Union, founded in 1990, working to promote women's rights and equality between women and men, and representing a total of more than 2000 organizations. EWL membership extends to organizations in 26 EU member states, three EU candidate countries, Iceland, and the UK, as well as to European-wide bodies.

With a secretariat based in Brussels, Belgium, the EWL is one of the longest-standing European level NGOs, and works closely with European institutions and civil society partners. Greek human rights advocate Konstantina (Dina) Vardaramatou succeeded Joanna Maycock as Secretary General in 2021. At the international level, the EWL has a consultative status at the Council of Europe, and participates regularly in the activities of the UN Commission on the Status of Women (CSW).

History
The European Women's Lobby was created in response to a growing awareness of the need to defend women's interests at the European level. European women's organizations had conferences as early as 1982 to create a structure of cooperation within the European Economic Community. Among the leading figures were Fausta Deshormes, Hilde Albertini, Odile Quintin, Liliana Richetta, Helga Thieme, and Jacqueline de Groote. In November 1987 in London, 120 women, members of 85 organizations representing 50 million individual members, came together, and adopted two resolutions. The first called for the "creation of a structure for influence, open to all interested women's organizations, to exert pressure on European and national institutions to ensure better defence and representation of women's interest". In a second resolution, the delegates called upon the European Commission to "lend its support for the organization in early 1988 of a meeting, with a view to the implementation of such a structure". Support was granted, and the European Women's Lobby and its secretariat in Brussels were formally established in 1990. The EWL was founded in 1990 by Belgium, Denmark, France, Germany, Greece, Ireland, Italy, Luxembourg, Portugal, Spain, The Netherlands, and the United Kingdom national coordinations and 17 large European-wide women's organizations. At the time, just twelve countries formed the European Union, then known as the European Communities (EC). Over the years, as new Member States joined the EC, new national co-ordinations became members of the EWL. While the EU enlarged to countries of Central and Eastern Europe, the EWL established links and cooperation with women's organizations in these countries.

Policies

Sex work 

The European Women's Lobby has been pushing for Europe-wide legislation criminalizing customers of sex workers (a policy opposed by many sex workers), and called for abolishing prostitution.

Women in politics 

The European Women's Lobby is a strong advocate of women's representation in politics at the European level, denouncing the under-representation of women. At the moment of the hearing of Ursula von der Leyen at the European Parliament confirming her as the new president and the first female president of the European Commission, the European Women's Lobby was calling for the European Commission to commit to a feminist Europe.

The European Women's Lobby has been also pushing for women quotas in private companies' management boards.

In the wake of the Me Too movement, which brought to light cases of sexual harassment at the European Parliament, the EWL called for putting in place adequate reporting structures at the EU institutions for cases of sexual harassment, in order to hold perpetrators accountable.

Women's economic independence 
The EWL has been denouncing the gender pay gap, made worse by the austerity measures in Europe following the financial crisis, pushing more women into poverty. In 2020, the economic fallout from the COVID-19 pandemic again disproportionally affected women, according to EWL.

European legislation 

The European Women's Lobby is monitoring European legislation. EWL raised the alarm regarding the effects on women of different European legislative proposal. For example, EU legislation imposing additional costs on plastic producers to achieve environmental objectives could have a negative economic impact on women if producers of single-use period products increase prices of period products containing plastic. In the area of digital policy the EWL has been advocating for the need to fight online violence in particular through the rules to be introduced in the Digital Services Act.

References

External links
 European Women's Lobby website

Women's rights organizations
Anti-prostitution feminism